AcademyHealth is a nonpartisan, nonprofit professional organization dedicated to advancing the fields of health services research and health policy. It is a professional organization for health services researchers, health policy analysts, and health practitioners, and it is a nonpartisan source for health research and policy. The organization was founded in 2000, in a merger between the Alpha Center and the Association for Health Services Research (AHSR).  In 2008, the organization had approximately 4000 health services researcher members.

The organization's first president, W. David Helms, was founder and director of the Alpha Center from 1976–2000.  Helms left the organization in December 2010.

The organization's current president, Lisa Simpson, assumed the role in January 2011.

History
AcademyHealth was established in June 2000, following a merger between the Alpha Center and the Association for Health Services Research (AHSR); the two organizations had been operating under a joint operation agreement since January 1999

Founded in March 1976 and based in Washington, D.C., the Alpha Center functioned as a health policy resource center, "assist[ing] public and private sector leaders in meeting health care challenges by providing research analysis, facilitation, education and training, strategic planning, and program management".

The Association for Health Services Research was formed in 1981 as the first professional organization for health services researchers.  It functioned as a non-profit professional society for individuals and organizations with a commitment to health services research. AHSR's mission included educating consumers and policymakers about the importance of health services research, disseminating information generated by health services researchers, securing funding for the field, and providing networking and professional development opportunities.

Since the merger, AcademyHealth has assumed the duties of both parent organizations.

Membership 

AcademyHealth's membership is divided into Contributing, Supporting, and Affiliate members.

Contributing members

Supporting members

Affiliate members

Programs and Projects
AcademyHealth manages several programs that serve the health services and policy communities.

Changes in Health Care Financing and Organization (HCFO)
Funded by the Robert Wood Johnson Foundation, the HCFO program seeks to bridge the health services research and health policy communities and to provide public and private decision makers with usable information on health care policy, financing, and organization. AcademyHealth serves as the HCFO program's National Program Office. Established in 1988 as the successor to RWJ's Program for Demonstration and Research on Health Care Costs, HCFO has since funded more than 265 projects on the effects of financing on cost, access, organization, and quality. The program has used meetings and conferences, newsletters, briefs, special papers, as well as peer-reviewed  journal articles to facilitate the dissemination of its findings to policymakers.

In their evaluation conducted under the Barents Group, Kathryn Langwell and James Monroe state that "HCFO represents a stable source of funding for health financing and organizational research which, given the federal budget deficit and current uncertainties, is a very important 'niche' from the perspective of the research community."

Health Services Research (HSR) Methods
The AcademyHealth HSR Methods Web site was designed to help researchers or research users cross-walk the language, study designs, and methods used by researchers in the variety of fields contributing to health services research.

AcademyHealth established a distinguished Methods Council, chaired by Bryan Dowd of the University of Minnesota, to oversee the process. The Council is composed of 25 members that represent leaders in a range of different disciplines and research methodologies.

Health Services Research Projects (HSRProj)
HSRProj is a free database containing more than 6,000 descriptions of ongoing health services research projects funded by government and state agencies, foundations, and private organizations.

Improving Hispanic Elders' Health: Community Partnerships for Evidence-Based Solutions
A "Health and Human Services pilot initiative aimed at improving the health and quality of life for Hispanic senior citizens," AcademyHealth serves as the contractor for this project, titled Improving Hispanic Elders' Health: Community Partnerships for Evidence-Based Solutions. It is designed to encourage Hispanic elders and their families to take advantage of new Medicare benefits, including prescription drug coverage, flu shots, diabetes screening and self-management, cardiovascular screening, cancer screening services and smoking cessation programs.

International Exchange for Health Care Policy and Research
The International Exchange for Health Care Policy and Research program manages and focuses on health issues of a global nature.  It has played an active role in convening a group to develop guidelines for foreign nurse recruiting.

Knowledge Transfer
Under contract to the Agency for Healthcare Research and Quality's (AHRQ) Knowledge Transfer Program, AcademyHealth works with health care providers, purchasers, health plans, and state and local government leaders to help them understand and apply health services research findings in their decision-making.

State Coverage Initiatives (SCI)
Funded by the Robert Wood Johnson Foundation, and administered by AcademyHealth, SCI works with state policy leaders to develop strategies to improve insurance coverage. SCI also produces the annual report, State of the States, providing a national perspective on state-based reform efforts.

Conferences
AcademyHealth hosts a number of conferences and seminars to address critical issues in health services research. The meetings provide opportunities for the presentation of research, debates on policy issues, and instruction in new methodologies.

Annual Research Meeting
A three-day conference, the ARM is a forum for health services researchers to present their work.  The conference attracts both individual and corporate researchers.  Once an intimate conference with only 300 attendees, the ARM has grown to host over 2,200 participants, and rotates between Washington, DC, Boston, Orlando, San Diego, Seattle, and Chicago.

National Health Policy Conference
A two-day conference, the NHPC examines the United States' health policy agenda for the upcoming year.  Past speakers have included advisers to presidential candidates Senators Hillary Clinton (D-N.Y.), Barack Obama (D-Ill.), and John McCain (R-Ariz.) House Democratic Leadership; AHRQ Director Carolyn Clancy, MD; Engelberg Center Director Mark McClellan, MD, PhD; Congressional Budget Office Peter Orszag; and Commonwealth Fund President Karen Davis.

Building Bridges: Making a Difference in Long-Term Care
A joint strategic initiative between AcademyHealth and The Commonwealth Fund, Building Bridges provides an opportunity for long-term care stakeholders to exchange information, debate the issues, seek solutions, and identify where additional research is needed.

The initiative seeks to foster development of a network of long-term care researchers, policy leaders, providers, consumer representatives, and funders through a series of annual colloquia and ongoing workgroup discussions among conference participants and others.

HSR Summit Series
The HSR Summit Series is funded by the Robert Wood Johnson Foundation and the Kellogg Foundation.  It consists of three summits, the first of which was held in November 2007, and focused on the health workforce.  Each summit commissions background papers, convenes invited stakeholders to discuss the papers and develop recommendations, and disseminates these recommendations to critical audiences.  The second summit will focus on methods and data, and the third summit will focus on knowledge transfer.

References

Medical and health organizations based in Washington, D.C.
2000 establishments in Washington, D.C.